New York, New York is a role-playing game supplement published by TSR in 1985 for the Marvel Super Heroes role-playing game.

Contents
New York, New York is a campaign setting briefly describing the New York City the Marvel heroes inhabit.

Publication history
MHAC6 New York, New York was written by Kate Novak and Jeff Grubb, with a cover by Ron Frenz, Josef Rubinstein, and Jeff Butler, and was published by TSR, Inc., in 1985 as two 16-page books with two outer folders.

Reception

Reviews

References

Marvel Comics role-playing game supplements
Role-playing game supplements introduced in 1985